The First Koizumi Cabinet governed Japan from April 2001 until November 2003 under the leadership of Prime Minister Junichiro Koizumi, who came to power after winning a surprise victory in the LDP presidential election of 2001. The cabinet continued the LDP-Komeito-NCP coalition and contained a record number of 5 women, including Makiko Tanaka as the first female Foreign Minister. Several ministers from the previous Mori Administration remained in office to ensure the continuity and stability of government. Unusually for an LDP leader, Koizumi chose his cabinet himself and personally asked ministers to join the government, unlike previous practice where party factional leaders often chose government posts.

Koizumi administration
Koizumi took office at a time of prolonged economic difficulties for Japan after the first "Lost Decade", including a banking sector affected by "bad loans". His policies promised bold structural reforms to economic, administrative and social policy using the slogans "reform with no sacred areas" and "without structural reforms there can be no economic recovery", explaining that he expected the country to endure short-term hardship, including higher unemployment, to make longer-term economic gains. Despite these promises of initial economic difficulties, the Koizumi cabinet enjoyed record popularity during its first year (reaching 90 percent in some polls), and the LDP gained several seats in the June 2001 upper house elections.

Koizumi's popularity declined significantly in early 2002 after he sacked Tanaka for disloyalty and for feuding with bureaucrats, and a series of scandals relating to the agriculture and foreign ministries came to light. In response, Koizumi ordered a quickening of the pace in terms of structural reform plans and made a highly publicised visit to North Korea in the autumn to discuss abducted Japanese citizens, which led to a recovery in his poll ratings. The first cabinet reshuffle then took place in September 2002 and did not bring about any major personnel changes, but did remove Financial Services Minister Hakuo Yanagisawa, who Koizumi felt was too timid on economic reform.

The second cabinet reshuffle took place in September 2003, following Koizumi's re-election as LDP leader by a large margin, and involved substantial changes including the promotion of the reformist Sadakazu Tanigaki to Finance Minister. Despite this, the key figures of Chief Cabinet Secretary Yasuo Fukuda and Economic and Fiscal Policy Minister Heizō Takenaka were kept in post. Koizumi then dissolved the Diet and called general elections in November 2003, which returned his coalition to office and led to the formation of the Second Koizumi Cabinet. The first Koizumi cabinet was the last to include the New Conservative Party as a coalition partner, which had declined in strength since its founding in April 2000 and finally merged with the LDP at Koizumi's suggestion after the 2003 election.

Election of the Prime Minister

Lists of Ministers 

R = Member of the House of Representatives
C = Member of the House of Councillors

Cabinet

Changes 
 January 30, 2002 - Foreign Minister Makiko Tanaka was dismissed following a series of leaks and public feuds with Foreign Ministry bureaucrats. Prime Minister Koizumi temporarily took over her duties until February 1, when Environment Minister Yoriko Kawaguchi was promoted as replacement. The senior Foreign Ministry official, Vice Minister Yoshiji Nogami was also removed.
 February 8, 2002 - Shortly after becoming Foreign Minister, Kawaguchi relinquished the Environment portfolio and was replaced by Hiroshi Ōki.

First Reshuffled Cabinet

Changes 
 December 25, 2002 - The Conservative Party was dissolved and reformed as the New Conservative Party when some members of the Democratic Party defected and allied with the Conservatives. The party continued in coalition.
 April 1, 2003 - Agriculture Minister Tadamori Oshima resigned due to a bribery scandal involving a former aide, and was replaced with Yoshiyuki Kamei.

Second Reshuffled Cabinet

Changes 
 November 11, 2003 - After poor results in the general election, the New Conservative Party accepted Koizumi's suggestion that it merge with the LDP. The NCP formally dissolved on November 21.

References

External links 
 Lionheart or Paper Tiger? A First-Term Koizumi Retrospective (Paper assessing Koizumi's first term 2001-2003)
Pages at the Kantei (English website):
 Koizumi Administration 
 List of Ministers 
 List of Ministers (First Reshuffle) 
 List of Ministers (Second Reshuffle)

Cabinet of Japan
2001 establishments in Japan
2003 disestablishments in Japan
Cabinets established in 2001
Cabinets disestablished in 2003
2001 in Japanese politics